Culcheth railway station served the village of Culcheth, Warrington, then in Lancashire, later in Cheshire, England. It was situated immediately west of the bridge whereby Wigshaw Lane crossed the railway.

History
Culcheth station opened on 1 April 1884 along with six other stations on the Wigan Junction Railways (WJR), which was backed by the Manchester, Sheffield and Lincolnshire Railway (MS&LR).

The Manchester, Sheffield and Lincolnshire Railway changed its name in 1897 to the Great Central Railway (GCR). The GCR absorbed the WJR on 1 January 1906.

The WJR line ran through Lancashire from Glazebrook West Junction to Wigan Centralbut was also a part of the bigger MS&LR/GCR network and therefore trains were originally provided by the MS&LR.

Services

In April 1884 there were seven trains in each direction per day, all running between Manchester Central railway station and Wigan Central. Of these six called at Culcheth. Two trains each way ran on Sundays, calling at all stations en route.

From 1900 until 1952 Culcheth was also served by passenger trains running to St Helens Central,.

In 1922 six "Down" (towards St Helens and Wigan) trains called at the station, "Weekdays Only" (Mondays to Saturdays.) These all ran All Stations from Manchester Central to St Helens via Glazebrook and Culcheth. It is difficult to be certain from the timetable whether these trains split at Lowton St Mary's with a portion proceeding to Wigan Central, or whether passengers for Wigan had to change, but in either event those same six trains also took Culcheth passengers All Stations to Wigan. Given the dwell times for St Helens trains, it appears that theirs was a through service.

A lone All Stations Manchester to Wigan train - 18:42 from Culcheth - had no St Helens connection or portion, serving the Wigan Central line only.

Three Down trains, one Fridays and Saturdays only and two Saturdays only, appeared to start at Culcheth calling All Stations to Wigan Central, with no St Helens portion or connection. It may be that these trains originated at Liverpool Central, turning West to North at the triangular Glazebrook West Junction, but the timetable doesn't seem to confirm this.

The "Up" service was broadly similar, but the mix of all week and Saturdays only/excepted was more complex.

No trains ran on Sundays.

In WW2 the line through Culcheth was more frequently used, though after 1945 the line started to deteriorate.

The services to and from St Helens came to a halt when that line closed to passenger traffic on 3 March 1952.

The station closed to passengers on 2 November 1964 and to freight in 1965 although the line survived as freight only until 1968.

The line through Culcheth was also a diversionary route and a route by which traffic such as Summer Saturday holiday specials could bypass busy spots, such as Wigan. Pixton, for example, has a fine 1961 shot of a Summer Saturday Sheffield to Blackpool train at Lowton St Mary's which will have passed through Culcheth. It would bear right at Hindley South onto the Whelley Loop and then join the WCML at Standish, bypassing Wigan altogether.

By far and away the most heavily loaded, but sporadic, passenger trains through the station were for Haydock Park racecourse.

The station site

The station was demolished in 1977 to be replaced by Culcheth Linear Park. The remains of a rear wall of one of the platforms can still be identified opposite the Linear Park's car park.

Routes

Notes

Sources

Further reading

External links

Disused railway stations in Warrington
Former Great Central Railway stations
Railway stations in Great Britain opened in 1884
Railway stations in Great Britain closed in 1964
Beeching closures in England